Isobel Elsom (born Isabelle Reed; 16 March 1893 – 12 January 1981) was an English film, theatre, and television actress. She was often cast as aristocrats or upper-class women.

Early years 
Born in Chesterton, Cambridge, Elsom attended Howard College, Bedford, England.

Career
She debuted on stage in London as a member of the chorus of The Quaker Girl (1911). Gilbert Miller promoted her to stardom in The Outsider.

Over the course of three decades, she appeared in 17 Broadway productions, beginning with The Ghost Train (1926). Her best-known stage role was the wealthy murder victim in Ladies in Retirement (1939), a role she repeated in the 1941 film version. Her other theatre credits included The Innocents and Romeo and Juliet. Elsom made her first screen appearance during the silent film era (she frequently co-starred with Owen Nares) and appeared in nearly 100 films throughout her career.

Elsom appeared as the leading lady for the Elitch Theatre summer season of 1928. At Elitch, she appeared in the role she created in the play The Outsider earlier that year on Broadway. A Denver reviewer of the play wrote:If there is anybody in this man's town who doubts that Isobel Elsom, leading woman at the Elitch Gardens Theatre, is an actress of the highest rank, let that doubting Thomas see her work in The Outsider ... She not only is scoring a brilliant personal triumph, but is demonstrating to local playgoers exactly why she was one of the most popular actresses London ever knew!She met her first husband, director Maurice Elvey, when he cast her in his 1919 film Quinneys. He directed her in eight more films before they divorced. Elsom's other screen credits included The White Cliffs of Dover (1944), The Unseen (1945), Of Human Bondage (1946), The Ghost and Mrs. Muir, Monsieur Verdoux, The Paradine Case, and The Two Mrs. Carrolls (all 1947), The Secret Garden (1949), Love Is a Many-Splendored Thing (1955), Lust for Life and 23 Paces to Baker Street (both 1956), and The Pleasure Seekers and My Fair Lady (both 1964).

She appeared opposite Jerry Lewis in four of his late 1950s/early 1960s films. Elsom's television credits included Armstrong Circle Theatre, Hallmark Hall of Fame, Lux Video Theatre, My Three Sons, Alfred Hitchcock Presents (at least four appearances), Playhouse 90, Hawaiian Eye, Straightaway, and Dr. Kildare.

Personal life
Elsom's second husband was actor Carl Harbord, married from 1947 until his death in 1958. She had no children.

Death
Elsom died of heart failure at the Motion Picture & Television Hospital in Woodland Hills, California, aged 87.

National Portrait Gallery
Five portraits of Elsom are included in the Photographs Collection of the National Portrait Gallery in London.

Partial filmography

 Milestones (1916) - Lady Monkhurst
 The Way of an Eagle (1918) - Mariel Roscoe
 Tinker, Tailor, Soldier, Sailor (1918) - Isobel Bunter
 God Bless Our Red, White and Blue (1918) - The Wife
 The Man Who Won (1918) - Milly Cooper
 Onward Christian Soldiers (1918) - The Girl
 Quinneys (1919) - Posy Quinney
 Linked by Fate (1919) - Nina Vernon
 Hope (1919) - Jenny Northcote
 Edge O' Beyond (1919) - Joyce Grey
 A Member of Tattersall's (1919) - Mary Wilmott
 The Elder Miss Blossom (1919) - Sophie Blossom
 Mrs. Thompson (1919) - Enid Thompson
 Nance (1920) - Nance Gray
 Aunt Rachel (1920) - Ruth
 For Her Father's Sake (1921) - Lilian Armitage
 The Game of Life (1922) - Alice Fletcher
 Dick Turpin's Ride to York (1922) - Esther Bevis
 A Debt of Honour (1922) - Hope Carteret
 The Harbour Lights (1923) - Dora Nelson
 The Wandering Jew (1923) - Olalla Quintane
 The Sign of Four (1923) - Mary Morstan
 The Love Story of Aliette Brunton (1924) - Aliette Brunton
 Who Is the Man? (1924) - Genevieve Arnault
 The Last Witness (1925) - Letitia Brand
 Le réveil (1925) - Thérèse de Mégèe
 Tragedy of a Marriage (1927) - Louise Radcliffe
Dance Magic  (1927) -  Selma Bundy
 The Other Woman (1931) - Roxanne Paget
 Stranglehold (1931) - Beatrice
 The Crooked Lady (1932) - Miriam Sinclair
 Illegal (1932) - Mrs. Evelyn Dean
 The Thirteenth Candle (1933) - Lady Sylvia Meeton
 The Primrose Path (1934) - Brenda Dorland
 Eagle Squadron (1942) - Dame Elizabeth Whitby
 The War Against Mrs. Hadley (1942) - Mrs. Laura Winters
 Laugh Your Blues Away (1942) - Mrs. Westerly
 Seven Sweethearts (1942) - Miss Abagail Robbins
 You Were Never Lovelier (1942) - Mrs. Maria Castro
 Forever and a Day (1943) - Lady Trimble-Pomfret
 First Comes Courage (1943) - Rose Lindstrom
 My Kingdom for a Cook (1943) - Lucille Scott
 The White Cliffs of Dover (1944) - Mrs. Bancroft (uncredited)
 Between Two Worlds (1944) - Genevieve Cliveden-Banks
 Casanova Brown (1944) - Mrs. Ferris
 The Unseen (1945) - Marian Tygarth
 Two Sisters from Boston (1946) - Aunt Jennifer
 Of Human Bondage (1946) - Mrs. Betty Athelny
 The Two Mrs. Carrolls (1947) - Mrs. Latham
 Monsieur Verdoux (1947) - Marie Grosnay
 The Ghost and Mrs. Muir (1947) - Angelica Muir
 Ivy (1947) - Charlotte Chattle
 Escape Me Never (1947) - Mrs. MacLean
 Love from a Stranger (1947) - Auntie Loo-Loo
 The Paradine Case (1947) - Innkeeper
 Smart Woman (1948) - Mrs. Rogers
 Addio Mimí! (1949) - Madame Garzin
 The Secret Garden (1949) - Governess
 Désirée (1954) - Mme. Clary - Désirée's Mother
 Deep in My Heart (1954) - Mrs. Harris
 The King's Thief (1955) - Mrs. Bennett
 Love Is a Many-Splendored Thing (1955) - Adeline Palmer-Jones
 Over-Exposed (1956) - Mrs. Payton Grange
 23 Paces to Baker Street (1956) - Lady Syrett
 Lust for Life (1956) - Mrs. Stricker
 The Guns of Fort Petticoat (1957) - Mrs. Charlotte Ogden
 Rock-A-Bye Baby (1958) - Mrs. Van Cleeve
 The Young Philadelphians (1959) - Mrs. Dewitt Lawrence (uncredited)
 The Miracle (1959) - Mother Superior
 The Turn of the Screw (1959) - Mrs. Grose
 The Bellboy (1960) - Hotel Guest (uncredited)
 The Errand Boy (1961) - Irma Paramutual
 The Second Time Around (1961) - Mrs. Rogers
 Who's Minding the Store? (1963) - Hazel, a Dowager
 My Fair Lady (1964) - Mrs. Eynsford-Hill
 The Pleasure Seekers (1964) - Dona Teresa Lacayo

References

External links

1893 births
1981 deaths
English stage actresses
English film actresses
English silent film actresses
English television actresses
People from Chesterton, Cambridge
British expatriate actresses in the United States
20th-century English actresses
Actresses from Cambridgeshire